Michel Christian Bergerac (13 February 1932 - 11 September 2016) was a French businessman who was president of cosmetics company Revlon in succession to Charles Revson. His older brother was actor and businessman Jacques Bergerac.

Bergerac was involved in the 1986 Delaware Supreme Court case Revlon, Inc. v. MacAndrews & Forbes Holdings, Inc..

See also
 Jacques Bergerac

References

1932 births
2016 deaths
People from Biarritz
University of Paris alumni
French businesspeople